AWOL is a 2016 romantic drama film written and directed by Deb Shoval and starring Lola Kirke and Breeda Wool.  It is based on Shoval's 2010 short film of the same name.  It is also Shoval's directorial debut.

Premise
A young woman, Joey, is in search of direction in her small town. A visit to an Army recruiting office appears to provide a path, but when she meets and falls in love with Rayna, that path diverges in ways that neither woman anticipates.

Cast
Lola Kirke as Joey
Breeda Wool as Rayna
Dale Soules as Ruthie
Bill Sage as Roy
Ted Welch as Pete
Britne Oldford as Haley
Libby George as Gram
Charlotte Maltby as Kristen
Sadie Butler as Sadie
Hannah Dillon as Hannah
David Koral as Chet

Reception
The film has a 93% approval rating on Rotten Tomatoes based on 15 reviews, with an average rating of 6.8/10.

References

External links
 
 

American romantic drama films
2016 directorial debut films
Features based on short films
2016 LGBT-related films
American LGBT-related films
LGBT-related romantic drama films
Lesbian-related films
2010s English-language films
2010s American films